Mike or Michael Platt may refer to:

 Michael B. Platt (1948–2019), American artist
 Michael Lee Platt (1954–1986), robbery suspect
 Michael Platt (financier) (born 1968), financier
 Michael Platt Jr. (born 1974), public official
 Michael Platt (rugby league) (born 1984), Ireland international rugby league player
 Mike Platt, contestant on The Voice UK (series 8)